Arcady may refer to:
 Arcady Ensemble, a Canadian musical ensemble
 ARCADY, traffic modelling software
 Alexandre Arcady (born 1975), French actor and film maker
 , US Navy ship

 Arcadia (ancient region), a region in Ancient Greece poetically associated with a tradition of rural, bucolic innocence
 Arcadia (regional unit), a region in modern Greece

See also 
 Arcadius (disambiguation) Latin name
 Arcadia (disambiguation)
 Arcadie, French homophile organization
 Arkady, a list of people with a Russian given name (sometimes spelt with a c) 
 Arkadiusz, a list of people with a Polish given name